All Saints Catholic Church was located at Goodlow Street opposite Kemper Lane (East Third Street) in Cincinnati, Ohio and was once known as Christ Church. The parish was organized by Rev. S. McMahon in 1837. The Parish served the English-speaking community, most members came from the growing Irish population of Cincinnati. The original Church was dedicated on November 9, 1845. The Parent Parishes was the Old Cathedral on Sycamore, now known as (St. Francis Xavier Church). All Saints had a congregation of 200 families in 1896. The Parish was closed in 1936.

The All Saints Catholic Church name was taken to a new parish, which was organized in 1948, north of Cincinnati at 8939 Montgomery Road in Kenwood, Ohio. In 2007, the main church underwent a major renovation, the first changes to the church since opening in 1954. The Pastor is Fr. J. Dennis Jaspers. The parish has grown immensely since opening in 1954 and now how has over 500 parishioners.

The parish also has a youth formation program, known as PREP, serving catholic youth in the surrounding area. In addition to the PREP program, the parish hosts a yearly festival that serves as its yearly fundraiser. The festival offers many different types of food and rides and also offers many varieties of games for all ages, with some including gambling. all money earned by the festival goes directly to the parish, and it is purely run by volunteers. The parish also hosts a yearly bible study for young children, called Vacation Bible School, or VBS, in the summer.

Their mission statement is, "We are All Saints Parishioners who are striving to live our faith through liturgy, formation, service, stewardship and fellowship."

All Saints School
All Saints Catholic Church, and now School, which was founded in 1957, grew largely for the first thirty years since the school's establishment. The school, which has enrolls grades kindergarten through 8th grade, now enrolls over 600 students including over a dozen staff. In 2011, All Saints School won the Blue Ribbon School for outstanding education. Since opening in 1957, the school now is home to a gymnasium, library, and a large science lab for junior high students. The school offers the common core educations for students and also offers electives and extracurricular activities, (i.e. coding, band, basketball, etc.) All Saints has an event called The Fine Arts Festival, which showcases the students' art projects and also offers a musical performance that includes many of the grades. There are singing and musical performances involved. All Saints School also hosts an annual Grandparents Day, where students host their grandparents for a day. The students and their grandparents participate in activities and also a prayer service. All Saints also hosts an annual book fair that is hosted by Scholastic and allows students to purchase books.

External links
All Saints, circa 1896
https://allsaints.cc/

Irish-American culture in Ohio
Roman Catholic churches in Cincinnati
Former Roman Catholic church buildings in Ohio